The Prêmio Extra de Televisão de melhor série (English: Extra Television Awards for Best Series/Miniseries) is a category of the Prêmio Extra de Televisão, destined to be the best drama series on Brazilian television.

Winner 
 2004 – Carga Pesada
 2005 – A Grande Família
 2006 – A Grande Família
 2007 – A Grande Família
 2008 – Toma Lá, Dá Cá
 2009 – Maysa: Quando Fala o Coração
 2010 – A Grande Família
 2011 – Tapas & Beijos
 2012 – Tapas & Beijos
 2013 – Tapas & Beijos
 2014 – Amores Roubados
 2015 – Felizes para Sempre?
 2016 – Justiça

References

External links 
Official website

Prêmio Extra de Televisão
Awards established in 2004
2004 establishments in Brazil